Tambunting Pawnshop is the oldest pawnshop in the Philippines, operating since 1906. The essence of business in Tambunting Pawnshop is lending money and accepting jewelry or storage (gadgets and appliances), and even mortgages of real estate and pledges of stocks as collateral. Loans are generally for a maximum period of six months, after which the collateral will be sold at auction or through their other jewelry outlets. Tambunting Pawnshop reached its centennial in 2006 and celebrated its 110th anniversary in 2016.

History
Tambunting Pawnshop was established by Don Ildefonso Tan Bunting in 1906.

After years of continuous expansion in his business, Don Ildefonso Tan Bunting tried the shipping business, and later started up the original pawnshop in the town of Santa Cruz, Manila with the name "Casa Agencia de Empeños de Ildefonso Tam Bunting".

By the time of World War II, his pawnshop had expanded to different locations inside and outside Metro Manila. By the 1990s, the newer generation of the Tambunting family already operated more than 300 branches nationwide. As of this year, Tambunting Pawnshop already has more than 1000 branches nationwide and is still expanding.

References

External links
Official website
Tambunting Pawnshop - Superbrands Philippines, Volume 2, pages 94 and 95

Financial services companies of the Philippines
Financial services companies established in 1906
Retail companies established in 1906
Pawn shops
Companies based in Makati
Philippine companies established in 1906